Parastenomordella ensifera is a species of beetle in the genus Parastenomordella of the family Mordellidae, which is part of the superfamily Tenebrionoidea. It was described in 1989 by Francisco.

References

Beetles described in 1989
Mordellidae